Petar Stoychev (born 24 October 1976 in Momchilgrad) is a Bulgarian swimmer who is one of the most successful long distance marathon swimmers in history. He is one of the greatest marathon swimmers of all time and an honor swimmer in the International Marathon Swimming Hall of Fame. Stoychev has 11 consecutive titles of a major international open water marathon swimming FINA series since 2001 (World Cup winner 2001–2006, Grand Prix winner 2007–2011) with more than 60 wins in individual swimming marathons. So far, he has swum over 60,000 km in pools, rivers, lakes, seas and oceans. Petar Stoychev has won 11 consecutive victories at the Traversée Internationale du Lac Memphrémagog in Magog, Canada (34 km) and at Lac Saint-Jean in Roberval, Canada (32 km). Also, he has won the Ohrid Lake, Macedonia swimming marathon 11 consecutive times (30 km). His swimming achievements include swimming around the Manhattan Island in 2010 and winning the extreme Cadiz Freedom Swim in 2011.

In addition to his numerous achievements in marathon swimming, he has participated in four Olympics – 2000 Summer Olympics in Sydney, 2004 Summer Olympics in Athens, 2008 Summer Olympics in Beijing, where he was the flag bearer for the Bulgarian Olympic team, and finished 6th in 10km at the 2012 Summer Olympics in London.

Petar Stoychev was formerly the holder of the world record for crossing the English Channel (24 August 2007) and the first swimmer to make the crossing in less than 7 hours (6:57:50). The previous record from 2005 (7:03:50) belonged to Christoph Wandratch (Germany). His record was broken by Australian swimmer Trent Grimsey on 8 September 2012.

English Channel Swims
2006 – 7 h 21 mins
2007 – 6 h 57 mins (WR)

Petar Stoychev won the first place at 2011 World Aquatics Championships in Shanghai, China during the 25 km event, thus becoming the first Bulgarian swimmer with a World Championship title.

He was inducted in the International Marathon Swimming Hall of Fame in Fort Lauderdale, Florida in September 2009. Petar Stoychev was selected in a global online poll as the 2009 World Open Water Swimming Man of the Year for his victorious marathon swims throughout the year.

Petar Stoychev is a member of the FINA Athletes' Commission.

References

External links
 

1976 births
Bulgarian male swimmers
Living people
Male long-distance swimmers
English Channel swimmers
Swimmers at the 2000 Summer Olympics
Swimmers at the 2004 Summer Olympics
Swimmers at the 2008 Summer Olympics
Swimmers at the 2012 Summer Olympics
Olympic swimmers of Bulgaria
People from Momchilgrad
World Aquatics Championships medalists in open water swimming
Manhattan Island swimmers
Sports ministers of Bulgaria